Shergo Biran (born 4 January 1979) is a German former professional footballer of kurdish ethnic origin who played as a forward. He was born in West Berlin.

References

External links 
 

1979 births
Living people
Footballers from Berlin
German people of Albanian descent
German footballers
Association football forwards
Bundesliga players
2. Bundesliga players
3. Liga players
BFC Preussen players
Berliner FC Dynamo players
Füchse Berlin Reinickendorf players
Tennis Borussia Berlin players
FC Hansa Rostock players
VfL Wolfsburg II players
VfL Osnabrück players
SV Eintracht Trier 05 players
SV Babelsberg 03 players
1. FC Union Berlin players
Dynamo Dresden players
1. FC Magdeburg players